Bowridge Hill is a hamlet 1 mile north east of Gillingham in Dorset, England, including the Grade II listed Lower Bowridge Hill Farmhouse, a 17th-century building once the home of the Greene family.

References

Further reading
The Greene Family in England and America, Boston 1901 

Hamlets in Dorset